Mark "Rocket" Watts Jr. (born June 1, 2000) is an American college basketball player for the Oakland Golden Grizzlies of the Horizon League. He previously played for the Michigan State Spartans and Mississippi State Bulldogs.

High school career
Watts spent his first year of high school with Allen Academy in Detroit, Michigan. As a freshman, he averaged 14.1 points and led his team to a 19–3 record. After Allen Academy closed, Watts transferred to Old Redford Academy in Detroit for his next two years. While at the school, he also played with The Family Detroit on the Amateur Athletic Union (AAU) circuit. In his sophomore season, Watts averaged 25.6 points, 6.2 assists, and 2.8 steals per game and earned Detroit News second-team All-Area honors. 

As a junior, Watts averaged 26.8 points, 5.6 rebounds, 5.4 assists, and 3.1 steals per game, helping Old Redford Academy to a 19–6 record. He was a Detroit News first-team All-Area pick. Watts was named first-team All-State in each of his first three seasons. For his senior season, Watts transferred with LaMelo Ball to SPIRE Institute and Academy, a boarding prep school in Geneva, Ohio. On January 26, 2019, he scored a career-high 64 points, with 15 three-pointers, in a win over St. Edward High School. Watts, on April 29, played in the Jordan Brand Classic all-star game.

Recruiting
By the end of his high school career, Watts was a consensus four-star recruit and top-40 player in the 2019 class. On September 22, 2018, he verbally committed to play college basketball for Michigan State. Watts had been recruited by Michigan State head coach Tom Izzo since eighth grade.

College career

2019–2020 season
Watts started his first career game on November 5, 2019, in place of the injured Joshua Langford against the Kentucky Wildcats. He was held scoreless, going 0-of-4 from the field while picking up 2 assists in 22 minutes played in the 62–69 loss. Five days later, against Binghamton, Watts collected his first career points, finishing with 5 in 23 minutes as the Spartans defeated Binghamton 100–46. On November 18, 2019, Watts recorded a then career-high 11 points to go with another career-high 7 total rebounds as the Spartans routed Charleston Southern 94–46. Watts suffered a leg injury in December 2019 and was forced to miss some time. At the time, he was averaging 6.5 points per game. On February 11, 2020, Watts scored a season-high 21 points in a 70–69 win against Illinois. He tied that mark of 21 points the next game, leading the team in scoring on February 25, 2020 as the Spartans won against the (then) higher ranked Iowa Hawkeyes, 78–70. Watts played a crucial role in the Spartan's game against Penn State on March 3, as they came back from a 15 point deficit at half to win by 8. He put up 18 points, second on the team that night. On March 8, Watts finished second on the team with 19 points in a 80–69 win over the Ohio State Buckeyes. At the close of the regular season, Watts was named to the Big Ten All-Freshman Team.

2020–2021 season
Watts tipped off his sophomore campaign by coming off the bench for 23 minutes, recording two points and three assists for Michigan State in a 83–67 win against Eastern Michigan. In his next game, an 80–70 win against Notre Dame, Rocket scored 13 points in his 20 minutes off the bench, good enough for second on the team that night. In addition, he tied his career high of 6 assists. In the Spartans 75–69 upset of Duke, Watts received his first start of the season. He responded by leading the team in scoring with 20 points, including 3 crucial late free throws to help stave off a Duke comeback. The next game, a 83–76 Spartan victory over Detroit Mercy, Watts once again received the start and led the team with a career high 23 points. He followed that up with 10 points and 6 assists in his third start on the season, a 79–61 win over Western Michigan. In the next game against Oakland, Watts ran into foul trouble early and wound up with 9 points in 22 minutes as the Spartans won 109–91 to improve to 6–0 on the season. In the Spartans first loss of the year, a 79–65 loss to Northwestern, Watts was ice cold, only scoring 5 points, all of which were in the final 4 minutes. Watts continued to struggle against Wisconsin, only scoring 5 points in 26 minutes as the Spartans dropped to 0–2 in conference, losing 85–76. He did set a new career high with 7 assists, however. In the next game, an 81–56 loss against Minnesota, Watts only scored 2 points.

On December 31, 2020, Spartans coach Tom Izzo stated that Watts would be moving back to his ‘natural’ position at shooting guard instead of point guard.

In MSU’s first conference win of the year, an 84–77 triumph over Nebraska, Watts scored 9 points coming off the bench, with two late free throws helping finish off the Cornhuskers.

On March 29, 2021, Watts entered the NCAA transfer portal thereby ending his career with the Spartans, ultimately transferring to Mississippi State.

2021–2022 season
Watts was limited to 19 games as a junior due to injuries to his hip and elbow. He averaged 4.4 points per game while shooting 40.2 percent from the floor and 26.7 percent from beyond the arc. After the season, coach Ben Howland was fired and Watts opted to transfer to Oakland.

National team career
Watts played for the United States under-18 basketball team at the 2018 FIBA Under-18 Americas Championship. He helped his team win the gold medal, averaging 6.8 points and 2.5 assists per game.

Career statistics

College

|-
| style="text-align:left;"| 2019–20
| style="text-align:left;"| Michigan State
| 27 || 16 || 22.3 || .389 || .281 || .800 || 2.3 || 1.7 || .5 || .0 || 9.0
|-
| style="text-align:left;"| 2020–21
| style="text-align:left;"| Michigan State
| 28 || 15 || 22.6 || .336 || .253 || .780 || 1.7 || 2.7 || .1 || .0 || 7.7
|- class="sortbottom"
| style="text-align:center;" colspan="2"| Career
| 55 || 31 || 22.5 || .363 || .269 || .789 || 2.0 || 2.2 || .3 || .0 || 8.4

Personal life
Watts was given the nickname "Rocket" while playing football at age five. His father Mark Sr. originally owned the nickname for the speed he displayed while playing high school football.

References

External links
Mississippi State Bulldogs bio
Michigan State Spartans bio
USA Basketball bio

2000 births
Living people
American men's basketball players
Basketball players from Detroit
Michigan State Spartans men's basketball players
Mississippi State Bulldogs men's basketball players
Oakland Golden Grizzlies men's basketball players
Point guards
Shooting guards